The Electrosport (also described as "Electric-sport") was a compact-sized electric vehicle based on the AMC Hornet that were converted by the Electric Fuel Propulsion Company (EFP) of Ferndale, Michigan.

Design 
The zero-emission Electrosport concept cars were made using American Motors Corporation (AMC) Hornet sedans and “Sportabout” station wagons from 1971 until 1974.

The Electrosport was designed to be a supplementary vehicle for commuting or daily chores and to be recharged at home using household electric current as well as at Charge Stations when away from home to replenish power in 45 minutes.

The company also established the “World's First Electric Car Expressway” between Detroit and Chicago - a distance of about  - that consisted of Interstate 94, but with six 50 kW charging stations that were located at Holiday Inn hotels near the highway. Additional charging stations were planned.

An EFP designed  direct current series-wound traction motor (the size of a one-gallon paint can) was bolted through an aluminum adapter plate to the car's standard clutch and 3-speed manual transmission. A total of 24 six-volt “TriPolar” cobalt-lead storage batteries were mounted under the hood and under a plywood floor in the trunk.

The company, and its president, Robert R. Aronson, were awarded several patents including the "Fifth Generation Lead Cobalt Battery". One 12-volt battery was provided for the car's lights and accessories. The solid-state, stopless controller was a modified unit from a forklift truck. An auxiliary gasoline heater with a one-gallon tank provided heat and defrosting. The system was called "Thunderbolt" by EFP and was billed as potentially installable in many different standard production Detroit automobiles.

The exterior of the Electrosport was differentiated from regular production Hornets by a one-piece solid fiberglass body-colored panel in place of the AMC's silver and black plastic grille. Additional gauges were added to the instrument panel. The Hornet's gas cap covered the three-prong plug mounted in the former fuel tank filler hole to which an extension cord connected to 220-volt AC power.

While reviewing a prototype, Motor Trend magazine indicated that cruising in second gear keeps the motor close to its 7000 revolutions per minute maximum will draw the least amount of electric current from the batteries, thus achieving a further range between recharges.

An Electrosport was used by the Golden Valley Electric Association of Fairbanks, Alaska, as a test to help deal with the increasing ice fog in the city. This thick, choking fog is caused when water vapor from automobile exhaust and other sources meets an air mass that is too cold to disperse it, as well as cold enough to crystallize it. The 5-passenger vehicle was capable of reaching  in below freezing weather, and after  of driving, its onboard fast-charger could replenish the batteries in less than 60 minutes.

The Electrosport was also tested and analyzed in a report about the impact of future use of electric cars in the Los Angeles region in 1974, as well as in a technical report on the performance of the Electrosport electric vehicle in 1975 by the United States Department of Energy.

The Electrosport was marketed as "a unique addition to the premium car market" and this was reflected in the station wagon's delivered price of UD$11,900 (state and local taxes not included). The company's target sales for the all-electric car were the New York City, Los Angeles, and Palm Beach, Florida markets. The plan was for EFP to be the first (modern) mass producer of electric autos with an expected order of 400 station wagons for the Electric Vehicle Council of the Edison Electric Institute.

For comparison, the original list price (manufacturers suggested retail price) of a standard gasoline-powered 1972 Hornet Sportabout station wagon was $2,587. Popular Science magazine noted that "you'll have to be a true idealist to place an order..."

Legacy 
Apollo Energy Systems later made other electric car models, including the 1972 X-144 Electric Car (based on an AMC Gremlin, the 1974 Santa Fe Luxury Sedan (based on an AMC Matador, and the 1978-2000 Silver Volt I. The technology developed by EFP has since been taken over by Apollo Energy Systems (AES).

References

 . Technical tests were conducted from August 1972 through July 1973.

Electric vehicles introduced in the 20th century
Concept cars
1970s cars
American Motors
Compact cars
Sedans
Station wagons